Leo Mansell (born 4 January 1985 on the Isle of Man) is a British racing driver. He is the son of 1992 Formula One world champion and 1993 PPG Indy Car World Series champion, Nigel Mansell, and elder brother of fellow racing driver Greg Mansell.

Leo and his younger brother have always raced in the same series, starting with Karting in 2000. The brothers ascended through the Karting ranks, and moved into single-seater racing in 2006, in the Formula BMW UK series.

The pair were granted drives in the finale of the 2006 British Formula Three Championship at Thruxton, driving for the Fortec Motorsport team, in Invitational Class, with Leo finishing in 14th position in the first race, and then 13th in the second.

Mansell, with his father Nigel, tested a Chamberlain-Synergy team Le Mans prototype Lola-AER B06/10 during the week commencing 14 July 2008 at the Estoril circuit. He raced for the Ferrari GT2 team in the Le Mans Series for the 2009 season.

For the 2010 season he co-drove a Ginetta-Zytek GZ09S – with his brother Greg and father Nigel – in select Le Mans Series events and in the 24 Hours of Le Mans. At the 8 Hours of Castellet they finished 9th overall (8th in LMP1), but their Le Mans effort was cut short due to a tyre failure and a crash by Nigel early in the event.

Racing record

American open–wheel racing results
(key)

Atlantic Championship

Complete 24 Hours of Le Mans results

External links
Q&A session with Leo and Greg

Footnotes

Mansell family
1985 births
Living people
Manx motorsport people
English racing drivers
British Formula Three Championship drivers
Atlantic Championship drivers
Formula BMW UK drivers
24 Hours of Le Mans drivers
European Le Mans Series drivers
Blancpain Endurance Series drivers
24 Hours of Spa drivers
Walker Racing drivers
Fortec Motorsport drivers